Clerodendrum chinense, called the glory bower, is a species of flowering plant in the genus Clerodendrum. It is native to Nepal, the eastern Himalayas, Assam, the Andaman and Nicobar Islands, south-central and southeast China, Southeast Asia, and Malesia. A popular garden plant, it has been widely introduced to the rest of the world, including Florida, the Caribbean, Bermuda, Central America, the Galápagos, South America, Ascension Island, the Gulf of Guinea islands, East Africa, the Seychelles, Pakistan, India, the Lesser Sunda Islands, Taiwan, the Cook Islands, Fiji, Niue, and the Society Islands. It has gained the Royal Horticultural Society's Award of Garden Merit.

References

chinense
Garden plants
Flora of Nepal
Flora of East Himalaya
Flora of Assam (region)
Flora of South-Central China
Flora of Southeast China
Flora of Indo-China
Flora of Malesia
Plants described in 1989